Maxim Maximovich Litvinov (born Meir Henoch Wallach; 17 July 1876–31 December 1951) was a Russian revolutionary, and prominent Soviet statesman and diplomat who served as People's Commissar for Foreign Affairs from 1930 to 1939.

Litvinov was an advocate for diplomatic agreements leading to disarmament, and was influential in making the Soviet Union a party to the 1928 Kellogg–Briand Pact. He was also chiefly for the 1929 adoption of the Litvinov Protocol, a multilateral agreement to bring into force the Kellogg-Briand Pact between the Soviet Union and several neighboring states. In 1930, Litvinov was appointed People's Commissar of Foreign Affairs, the highest diplomatic position in the Soviet state.

During the 1930s, Litvinov became an advocate for the official Soviet policy of collective security with Western powers against Nazi Germany.

Early life and first exile 

Meir Henoch Wallach was born into a wealthy, Yiddish-speaking, Lithuanian Jewish banking family in Białystok, Grodno Governorate, Russian Empire, which was formerly part of the Polish–Lithuanian Commonwealth. Meir was the second son of Moses and Anna Wallach. In 1881, Moses Wallach was arrested, held in prison for six weeks, then released without charge. Meir was educated at a local realschule; in 1893 he joined the army but was discharged in 1898 after he disobeyed an order to fire into a crowd of striking workers in Baku. In 1898 in Kyiv, Wallach joined the Russian Social Democratic Labour Party (RSDLP), which was considered an illegal organization, and it was customary for its members to use pseudonyms. Mier changed his name to Maxim Litvinov—a common Litvak surname—but was also known as "Papasha" and "Maximovich". Litvinov also wrote articles under the names "M.G. Harrison" and "David Mordecai Finkelstein".

Litvinov's early responsibilities included propaganda work in the Chernigov Governorate. In 1900, Litvinov became a member of the Kyiv party committee, the entirety of which were arrested in 1901. After 18 months in custody, Litvinov and Nikolay Bauman organised a mass escape of 11 inmates from Lukyanivska Prison; they overpowered a warden, and used ropes and grappling irons to scale the walls. Litvinov moved to Geneva, where the founder of Russian Marxism Georgi Plekhanov enlisted him as an agent of the revolutionary newspaper Iskra. Litvinov organised a route to smuggle the newspaper from Germany into Russia.

In July 1903, Litvinov was in London for the party's its second congress when the RSDLP split. He became a founding member of the Bolshevik faction, which was led by Vladimir Lenin, whom Litvinov first met in the British Museum Reading Room. Lenin and Litvinov went to Hyde Park to hear some of the speeches, and remained in contact with each other  during this period. Litvinov returned to Russia during the 1905 Revolution, when he became editor of the RSDLP's first legal newspaper Novaya Zhizn in Saint Petersburg.

Second emigration 

When the Russian government began arresting Bolsheviks in 1906, Maxim Litvinov left the country and spent the next ten years as an émigré and arms dealer for the party. He based himself in Paris and travelled throughout Europe. Posing as an officer in the Ecuadorian Army, he bought machine guns from the State Munitions Factory in Denmark, and posing as a Belgian businessman, he bought more weapons from Schroeder and Company of Germany. he then arranged for the whole consignment to be transported to Bulgaria, where he told the authorities the arms were destined for Macedonian and Armenian rebels fighting for independence in the Ottoman Empire. Litvinov then bought a yacht, and handed it and the weapons to the Armenian revolutionary Kamo to be smuggled across the Black Sea. The yacht, however, ran aground and the weapons were stolen by Romanian fishermen. Despite this setback, Litvinov successfully smuggled these arms into Russia via Finland and the Black Sea.

In 1907, Litivnov attended the fifth RSDLP congress in London. Initially, he relied on Rowton Houses for accommodation in London but the party eventually arranged a rented house for Litvinov, which he shared with Joseph Stalin, who also wanted to find more-comfortable housing than the Rowton hostels.

In January 1908, French police arrested Litvinov under the name Meer Wallach while carrying twelve 500-ruble banknotes that had been stolen in a bank robbery in Tiflis the year before. The Russian government demanded his extradition but the French Minister for Justice Aristide Briand ruled Litvinov's crime was political and ordered him to be deported. He went to Belfast, Ireland, where he joined his sister Rifka and her family. There, he taught foreign languages in the Jewish Jaffe Public Elementary School until 1910.

Litvinov moved to England in 1910 and lived there for eight years. In 1912, he replaced Lenin as the Bolshevik representative on the International Socialist Bureau. When the First World War broke out in 1914, the Tsar requested all Russian émigrés who were in England and liable for Russian military service be returned to fight in the Imperial Russian Army. Litvinov was able to convince the English officer who interviewed him he would be tried rather than conscripted if he returned to Russia.

In February 1915, Litvinov, uninvited, attended a conference of socialists from the Triple Entente that included Keir Hardie, Ramsay MacDonald and Emile Vandervelde; and the Mensheviks Yuri Martov and Ivan Maisky. Lenin prepared a statement demanding every socialist who held a government post should resign and opposing the continuation of the war. The conference chairman refused to allow Lenin to finish speaking. Litvinov regularly spoke in public opposing the war but failed to accept the fact the UK had declared war to avoid breaking a treaty to defend Belgium. At the peak of his power in the 1930s, Litvinov would emphasise the importance of abiding by the terms of treaties. He addressed the conference of the Entente Labour Parties but they were not persuaded to change course:

While holding the olive branch in one hand, we have to hold the sword in the other. We have been forced to take up the sword as the only means of defence. We must not forget we are able to assemble here because the Royal Navy hold the high seas and millions of Allied troops hold the line. If Germany was to succeed, the resolutions we pass would be a mere scrap of paper and of no more value than the Russian bank notes of the Russian state bank.

Later, a mutiny took place on a Russian ship in the River Mersey. The police, having been warned of possible trouble, had the ship under surveillance. When shouts that the crew were threatening to kill their officers were heard, the ship was boarded and the crew were arrested. Shortly before the mutiny, a police report confirmed Litvinov had received the sailors very well. Litvinov had not tried to dissuade the sailors from carrying out the mutiny or to condemn it, and may have encouraged it.

Litvinov also sought interviews with British, American, Australian and Canadian soldiers, and inculcated them with Bolshevik ideas. He also induced British and American soldiers of Jewish descent to carry on propaganda in their regiments. On one occasion, thirty Royal Engineers, along with some American and Canadian soldiers, were received in Litvinov’s office. It was assumed Litvinov was similarly encouraging them to state their grievances.

In England, Litvinov met and in 1916 married Ivy Low, the daughter of a Jewish university professor.

Diplomatic career

First Soviet representative to Britain
On 8 November 1917, a day after the October Revolution, the Council of People's Commissars (Sovnarkom) appointed Mixim Litvinov as the Soviet government's plenipotentiary representative in the United Kingdom. His accreditation was never officially formalised and his position as an unofficial diplomatic contact was analogous to that of Bruce Lockhart, Britain's unofficial agent in Soviet Russia. Litvinov was allowed to speak freely, even after the Treaty of Brest-Litovsk, which took Russia out of the war.

In January 1918, Litvinov addressed the Labour Party Conference, praising the achievements of the Revolution. Alexander Kerensky, the leader of the democratic Russian Provisional Government that had replaced the Tsar and was overthrown by Lenin, was welcomed by the British government on a visit to London and also addressed the Labour Party Conference, criticising the dictatorship of Lenin’s government. Litvinov replied to Kerensky in the left-wing English press, criticising him as being supported by foreign powers and intending to restore Tsarism Litvinov secured the release of Georgy Chicherin from Brixton prison but later in 1918, the British government arrested Litvinov, ostensibly for having addressed public gatherings held in opposition to British intervention in the ongoing Russian Civil War. Litvinov was held until he was exchanged for Lockhart, who had been similarly imprisoned in Russia.

Following his release, Litvinov returned to Moscow, arriving there at the end of 1918. He was appointed to the governing collegium of the People's Commissariat of Foreign Affairs (Narkomindel) and immediately dispatched on an official mission to Stockholm, Sweden, where he presented a Soviet peace appeal. Litvinov was subsequently deported from Sweden but spent the next months as a roving diplomat for the Soviet government, helping to broker a multilateral agreement allowing the exchange of prisoners of war from a range of combatants, including Russia, the UK and France. This successful negotiation amounted to de facto recognition of the new revolutionary Russian government by the other signatories to the agreement and established Litvinov's importance in Soviet diplomacy.

Litvinov tried to intervene in Britain's internal politics, agreeing to the request of the Daily Herald, a newspaper supporting the Labour Party, to ask the Soviet government for financial assistance, saying:

If we do not support the Daily Herald, which is now passing through a fresh crisis, the paper will have to turn to a Right trade union. On Russian questions it acts as if it is our organ. After [George] Lansbury’s journey to Moscow earlier in the year, the Herald has moved considerably to the Left and decidedly advocates direct action in support of the Soviet regime. It needed £50,000 in six months, after which once again it hoped to be on firm ground. I beg for an early and favourable answer because there is no hope of establishing a purely Communist newspaper at this time.

In view of the publicity caused by the leak, the Daily Herald did not accept the money.

Irish contacts and the Anglo-Soviet Trade Agreement

In February 1921, the Soviet government was approached by the government of the unilaterally declared Irish Republic in Dublin with proposals for a treaty of mutual recognition and assistance. Despairing of early American recognition for the Irish Republic, President of the Dáil Éireann Éamon De Valera had redirected his envoy Patrick McCartan from Washington to Moscow. McCartan may have assumed Litvinov, with his Irish experience, would be a ready ally. Litvinov, however, told McCarten the Soviet priority was a trade agreement with the UK.

In March 1921, the Anglo-Soviet Trade Agreement, authorising trade between the two countries so gold sent to Britain to pay for goods could not be confiscated, was signed but the British government and the British press began to complain about Moscow-directed subversion. In June, the British government published a proposed treaty between the Dáil government and the Soviets, and related correspondence; and the question of Communist intrigue in the Irish War of Independence made headlines.

Finally, the British Foreign Secretary sent a note of protest to the Soviet Government, charging it with responsibility for a range of intrigues against the British Government and its imperial interests. Litvinov replied:

The British Foreign Office has been misled by a gang of professional forgers and swindlers, and had it known the dubious sources of its information, its note of 7 September would never have been produced. The British Government's complaints of anti-British activities in India, Persia, Turkistan, Angora and Afghanistan to a certain extent are based on the above-mentioned fictitious reports and speeches, but the Russian Government wishes to state most emphatically that, after the conclusion of the Anglo-Russian agreement, it had given strict instructions to its representatives in the East to abstain from any anti-British propaganda. True to the principle of self-determination, the Soviet Government and its representatives exercise the greatest respect for the independence of the Eastern countries in giving up the privileges and concessions forcibly extorted from them by the Tsarist Government.

The Russian Government, on its part, feels compelled to place on record that the attitude of the British Government has lately been far from friendly towards Russia.

The imprisonment by British authorities in Constantinople of a number of Russian trade agents and their expulsion without any charge having been preferred against them, the co-operation with the French Government in the so-called ‘Russian question’, the continued support given to French schemes tending to frustrate every effort on behalf of various countries and international bodies to bring some help to the famine-stricken population of Russia, and lastly the presentation of the British note itself of 7 September with its grave charges based merely on imaginary facts and unchecked loose information obtained from dubious sources at a time when France was inciting Poland and Rumania to make war on Russia, do not belong to the category of facts that would induce the Russian Government to believe  that it is the sincere desire of the British Government to foster friendly relations between the governments and peoples of the two countries.

First Deputy People's Commissar of Foreign Affairs

In 1921, Litvinov was appointed First Deputy People's Commissar of Foreign Affairs, second in command to People's Commissar Georgy Chicherin (1872–1936). Although both men were loyal to the Soviet regime, Litvinov and Chicherin were temperamental opposites and became rivals. Chicherin had a cultivated, polished personal style but held strongly anti-Western opinions. He sought to hold Soviet Russia aloof from diplomatic deal-making with capitalist powers. According to diplomatic historian Jonathan Haslam, Litvinov was less erudite and coarser than Chicherin but was willing to deal in good faith with the West for peace and a pause for Soviet Russia to pursue internal development.

In 1924, full diplomatic relations had been restored under the Macdonald Labour government.  The Conservative Party and the business community continued to be hostile to the Soviet Union, partly because the Soviet Union had not honoured Tsarist debts and partly because of the fear of Bolshevism spreading to Britain, and considered the Bolshevist government should be militarily overthrown. This was exacerbated by the Soviet government's support of the 1926 General Strike and criticism of the British Trades Union Congress (TUC) for calling off the strike. The Soviet government offered a gift of £25,000 to the TUC, which was refused, and £200,000 to the co-operative movement, which was accepted.

Litvinov wanted to prevent a deterioration of relations and suggested he should have talks with Hodgson, the UK's chargé d'affaires in Moscow.  Hodgson, who was privately sympathetic to some of Litvinov’s complaints, communicated with the Foreign Office, giving four reasons for criticising Britain's position:

In the first place we had signed a trade agreement as long ago as 1921 and in 1923 we went a step further by conferring on the Soviet Government de jure recognition.

Secondly, it be known upon several occasions in the past six months that HM Government have every intention of maintaining its relationship with the Soviet Government unless the latter do something quite intolerably offensive.

Third, the outbursts of enthusiasts carried away by their legitimate emotions are liable to prejudice our position in dealing with problems which, being in relation with the Soviet Government, we have to solve by discussion with that Government.

Fourth, the Soviet Union whatever her political complexion, is a market and we badly need markets. The red bandit battle cry may conceivably serve a useful purpose in the political warfare at home. On this question I can offer no opinion. I can, however, lay it down as a proposition that in so far as our relations with Russia are concerned, the expressions of resentment which it epitomises are definitely detrimental to our essential interest. That we should be alarmed at the activity of Soviet agitators is an admission of weakness which is hailed with delight over here.

Yet the most pressing aspect is the commercial one and here the anti-red campaign does positive and immediate harm which it is impossible to calculate in Pounds Sterling. It creates a policy of insecurity which makes the Soviet Government hesitant about placing orders in Britain, causes British firms to fight shy of Russian orders and frightens British banks from financing them.

The Conservative government, under pressure from Conservative MPs on the uncorroborated evidence of a dismissed employee that the Soviet Trade Mission had stolen a missing War Office document, successfully asked Parliament to sever diplomatic relations with the Soviet Union. Although Chicherin advocated caution, Litvinov, presumably with Stalin’s support, said:

The decision was no surprise to the Soviet Government. It had already for long been aware that a rupture of diplomatic relations with the Union of Soviet Socialist Republics was being prepared by the whole policy of the present British Conservative Government, which has declined all proposals of the Soviet Government for the settlement of mutual relations by means of negotiations. The lack of results of the search of the Trade Delegation premises, which was carried out with utmost thoroughness over several days, is the most convincing proof of the loyalty and correctitude of the official agents of the Union of Socialist Soviet Republics. The Soviet Government passes over with contempt the insinuations of a British Minister regarding espionage by the Trade Delegation and considers it beneath its dignity to reply to them. The Soviet Government places on record that the British Government had no legitimate ground for a police raid on the extra-territorial premises of the official Soviet agent.

Hodgson, the British chargé d'affaires, agreed with Litvinov the Arcos Raid was deplorable and said so in a letter to The Times in 1941, showing his pleasure at Litvinov’s appointment as Soviet ambassador to the United States.

After the Labour Party won the most seats in the 1929 British General election, the new Prime Minister Ramsay MacDonald set about restoring relations with the Soviet Union on the condition the Soviet Union refrained from initiating propaganda in Britain. Litvinov was in favour of being conciliatory, letters between Joseph Stalin and Vyacheslav Molotov show Stalin overruled Litvinov’s conciliatory attitude, resulting in British Foreign Secretary Arthur Henderson ignoring problems rather than working towards an effective agreement on propaganda, effectively giving unconditional recognition to the Soviet Union.

Proponent of disarmament
The national joint Council of the Labour Party, the Parliamentary Labour Party and the TUC passed a resolution expressing their sense of great importance of the proposals of general-and-simultaneous disarmament proposed by the Soviet delegation at the Preparatory Disarmament Commission in Geneva on 30 November 1927.

Litvinov supported the principle of disarmament and favoured Soviet participation in the Kellogg-Briand Pact of 1928, which pledged signatories to the elimination of the use of war as a tool of foreign policy—a position opposite to that advocated by his nominal superior Chicherin. Litvinov, who was frustrated by the failure of the Kellogg-Briand Pact signatories to ratify the treaty, proposed the Litvinov Protocol, in which signatories formally proclaimed themselves in mutual compliance with the pact's goals. The protocol was signed in Moscow in February 1929 by the Soviet Union, Poland, Romania, Latvia, and Estonia, and later by several other countries.

Litvinov was also a supporter of, and actively attended, the Preparatory Commission of the Conference on Disarmament from 30 November 1927 until it was replaced by the disarmament conference in 1932, advocating total disarmament. French politician Joseph Paul-Boncour criticised such proposals saying:

Supposing you had total disarmament; if there was no international organisation taking charge of security, if you had no international force to ensure the maintenance of this security, if you had no international law such as we are endeavouring to lay down here, a powerful and populous nation would always have the power when it wished to do so on a small nation equally disarmed, less populous and less well equipped to resist an attack which might be made upon it.

Litvinov’s answer was:

Would small nations be less insecure after their powerful neighbours who have disarmed than they are now when, in addition to economic, financial, territorial and other superiorities possessed by the great powers, the latter also enjoy the immense advantage of greater armaments.

Most of the delegates to the Disarmament Conference despised the proposals but they won Litvinov favourable publicity in radical circles in Western countries that were eager for disarmament and impatient at the commission's slow progress.

People's Commissar of Foreign Affairs 

In 1930, Joseph Stalin appointed Litvinov People's Commissar for Foreign Affairs. Litvinov, who was a firm believer in collective security, worked to form a closer relationship with France and the United Kingdom, a policy seemingly at odds with the "class against class" line of the Third Period being advocated by Communist International. Litvinov remained the only leading official of Narkomindel in the mid-1930s who had direct personal access to Stalin and who could deal with Stalin's inner circle on terms approaching equality; this was in contrast to other top foreign-affairs officials such as Boris Stomonyakov and Nikolay Krestinsky, for whom access was limited to occasional supplication.

Stalin was largely detached from and uninterested in foreign policy throughout the early 1930s, largely leaving the general operations of Narkomindel and the Comintern to their leaders. Litvinov had wide latitude to pursue policy objectives and was subject only to broad review and approval from the leadership. Stalin frequently delegated oversight to members of his personal secretariat, including Karl Radek, until mid 1936. As a result, Litvinov's Narkomindel could pursue a moderate foreign-policy line, emphasising stable relations between governments leading towards general disarmament, which was, as one historian called it, a "curious mismatch" with the revolutionary militance then voiced by the Comintern.

On 6 February 1933, Litvinov made the most-significant speech of his career, in which he tried to define aggression. He stated the internal situation of a country, alleged maladministration, possible danger to foreign residents, and civil unrest in a neighbouring country were not justifications for war. This speech became the authority when war was justified. British politician Anthony Eden had said; "to try to define aggression was a trap for the innocent and protection for the guilty". In 1946, the British Government supported Litvinov’s definition of aggression by accusing the Soviet Union of not complying with Litvinov’s definition of aggression. Finland made similar criticisms against the Soviet Union in 1939.

Many delegates, such as British delegate Lord Cushendun, who said the failure of the Disarmament Conference would be gratifying to the Soviet delegation, derided Litvinov but due to the soundness of Litvinov’s argument and eloquence, his standing grew. In 1933, the Greek Chairman of the Political Commission of the League of Nations stated:It was with special pleasure he paid this tribute to the Soviet delegation since it demonstrated beyond doubt that when men rose above the contingencies of day-to-day politics and allowed themselves to be guided by the more general ideas which should lead the civilised world, it was found that there was a community of ideals which was capable with a little goodwill of bringing to fruition the noblest and most difficult enterprises.

In 1933, Litvinov was instrumental in winning a long-sought formal diplomatic recognition of the Soviet government by the United States. US President Franklin Roosevelt sent comedian Harpo Marx to the Soviet Union as a goodwill ambassador. Litvinov and Marx became friends and performed a routine on stage together. Litvinov also facilitated the acceptance of the Soviet Union into the League of Nations, where he represented his country from 1934 to 1938.

In 1935, Litvinov negotiated the Franco-Soviet Treaty of Mutual Assistance and another treaty with Czechoslovakia with the aim of containing Nazi Germany's aggression. Writing in A History of the League of Nations (1952), F. P. Walters expressed "astonished admiration", praising Litvinov's farsighted analysis:

Litvinov has been considered to have concentrated on taking strong measures against Italy, Japan and Germany, and being little interested in other matters.  He praised the achievements of the Soviet Union but he may not have agreed with collective farming.  At the time of the Moscow Trials, Litvinov was appointed to a committee the decided the fate of Nikolai Bukharin and Rykov, voting for them to be expelled and tried but not executed, they were eventually handed to the NKVD.  During the Great Purge, the Foreign Commissariat lacked ambassadors in nine capitals; Litvinov reported this to Stalin, noting the damage without criticising the cause. Indeed, Litvinov publicly endorsed the purges and the campaign against the Trotskyites, although this may have been for self-preservation.

Negotiations regarding Germany and dismissal 

After the 1938 Munich Agreement, German state media derided Maxim Litvinov for his Jewish ancestry, referring to him as "Finkelstein-Litvinov". On 15 April 1939, Litvinov sent a comprehensive proposal to Stalin for a tripartite agreement with Britain and France.  The following day, Litvinov saw Stalin to discuss his draft,which Stalin approved. Because of Litvinov’s initiative, the tripartite pact proposals were submitted to Stalin. According to Soviet records, Litvinov submitted detailed arguments in favour of the proposed pact, which Stalin accepted. Litvinov stated they ought not to wait for the other side to propose what the Soviets wanted. Litvinov summarised his proposals, which were for mutual assistance in case of aggression against the Soviet Union, Britain or France; and support for all states bordering the Soviet Union, including Finland and the Baltic States. It also provided for rapid agreement on the form such assistance would take. There would be an agreement not to conclude a separate peace. 

By 16 April, Stalin still had faith in Litvinov and had no immediate plans to remove him.  No concrete proposals for a Nazi-Soviet pact had been made by either country. Litvinov said: "We can expect urgent and complex negotiations with the French and especially the British. We need to monitor public opinion and try to influence it."  The new proposals had Stalin's support; Litvinov summoned Seeds while he at the theatre with his wife.  Litvinov could have had the proposals conveyed to the Embassy with a request for Seeds to visit Litvinov urgently in the morning.

Litvinov had a poor opinion of British politician Neville Chamberlain, and was not surprised ussia’s proposal for an alliance was not welcomed, but he may have been surprised by the attitude of the British Foreign Office.  Cadogan, in his diary, described Litvinov’s proposals as "mischievous".  A Foreign Office report to the Foreign Affairs Cabinet Committee termed them ‘inconvenient.’  On 7 June 1939, British politician Winston Churchill stated he "much preferred the Russian proposals. They are simple. They are logical and conform to the main groupings of common interest." Churchill also stated the Soviet claim the Baltic States should be included in the triple guarantee was well founded.  Three years later, Britain agreed a similar pact of assistance with the Soviet Union.  In the meantime, the USSR's major ally France had been defeated, many of Britain’s cities and towns devastated by German bombing, and Britain’s financial reserves decimated by the cost of the war. Litvinov’s proposals were also conveyed to the French Ambassador. 

As soon as the proposals reached the French Government, Bonnet’s first reaction was different from that of the British Government and Foreign Office. Bonnet saw the Soviet ambassador Suritz, who cabled that "the first impression of the French is very favourable". Britain persuaded the French Government to take no action until a common policy had been formulated. In talks between the French and the British governments, both failed to either accept or reject the proposals until after Litvinov’s dismissal on 4 May.  Molotov proceeded with negotiations for a pact and a military mission left for Moscow 

The Foreign Office confirmed to the US chargé d’affaires on 8 August 1939; "the military mission, which had now left for Moscow, had been told to make every effort to prolong discussions until 1 October 1939".  Halifax disclosed to the  Foreign Affairs Committee on 10 July 1939: "Although the French were in favour of the military conversations commencing, the French Government thought that the military conversations would be spun out over a long time and as long as they were taking place we should be preventing Soviet Russia from entering the German camp".

Dismissal
On 3 May 1939, Stalin replaced Litvinov, who was closely identified with the anti-German position, with Vyacheslav Molotov. At a prearranged meeting, Stalin said: "The Soviet Government intended to improve its relations with Hitler and if possible sign a pact with Nazi Germany. As a Jew and an avowed opponent of such a policy, Litvinov stood in the way." Litvinov argued and banged on the table. Stalin then demanded Litvinov to sign a letter of resignation. On the night of Litvinov's dismissal, NKVD troops surrounded the offices of the Commissariat of Foreign Affairs. The telephone at Litvinov's dacha was disconnected and the following morning, Molotov, Georgy Malenkov, and Lavrenty Beria arrived at the commissariat to inform Litvinov of his dismissal. Many of Litvinov's aides were arrested and beaten, possibly to extract compromising information.

Hitler took Litvinov’s removal more seriously than Chamberlain.  The German ambassador to the Soviet Union, Schulenburg, was in Iran. Hilger, the First Secretary, was summoned to see Hitler, who asked why Stalin might have dismissed Litvinov. Hilger said: "According to my firm belief he [Stalin] had done so because Litvinov had pressed for an understanding with France and Britain while Stalin thought the Western powers were aiming to have the Soviet Union pull the chestnuts out of the fire in the event of war".

Litvinov was not in disgrace. Litvinov continued to attend official functions and carry out his duties as a member of the Supreme Soviet and Central Committee. According to Barmine, during this period, Litvinov sometimes appeared on the official tribune for special occasions  Cassidy occasionally saw Litvinov and his wife at the Bolshoi Theatre.

Litvinov also attended the Supreme Soviet when the budget was presented. He attended a number of sittings of the Supreme Soviet, most notably on the occasion of Molotov’s statement on foreign policy There was no praise or recognition of Litvinov’s work after he had held the position of Foreign Minister for nine years. Two months later, when Litvinov applied for a passport to go to Vichy, France, to take the waters, it was refused, presumably on the grounds he may defect or abscond.

Litvinov was present during Molotov's speech to the Supreme Soviet in support of the Nazi-Soviet Pact.

According to Louis Fischer, "Litvinov never by hint or word approved of Stalin’s pact with Hitler". Ivy Litvinov stated; "the Nazi-Soviet Pact had not inspired her husband with much confidence". Litvinov would not have been surprised if Germany had broken any agreement and would have ensured the USSR would have been well  prepared for a German invasion of its territory.

Aftermath of dismissal

According to Holroyd-Doveton, Litvinov, if he had been Foreign Commissar, Litvinov would have approved the Pact. Sheinis states when foreign correspondents first asked Litvinov about the Pact, he evaded the question, but then said: "I think this calls for a closer look, because among other things enemies of the Soviet Union ascribe to me what I never said". Litvinov is reported to have told Ehrenburg; "The Pact was absolutely necessary". He told foreign journalists:The imperialists in these two countries had done everything they could to goad Hitler’s Germany against the Soviet Union by secret deals and provocative moves. In the circumstances the Soviet Union could either accept German proposals for a non-aggression treaty and thus secure a period of peace in which to redouble preparations to repulse the aggressor; or turn down Germany’s proposals and let the warmongers in the Western camp push the Soviet Union into an armed conflict with Germany in unfavourable circumstances and in a setting of complete isolation. In this situation the Soviet Government was compelled to make the difficult choice and conclude a non-aggression treaty with Germany. I, too, would probably have concluded a pact with Germany although a bit differently.

The replacement of Litvinov with Molotov significantly increased Stalin's freedom to manoeuver in foreign policy. The dismissal of Litvinov, whose Jewish background was viewed disfavorably by Nazi Germany, removed an obstacle to negotiations with Germany. Stalin immediately directed Molotov to "purge the ministry of Jews". Recalling Stalin's order, Molotov commented: "Thank God for these words! Jews formed an absolute majority in the leadership and among the ambassadors. It wasn't good."

Given Litvinov's prior attempts to create an anti-fascist coalition, association with the doctrine of collective security with France and Britain, and pro-Western orientation by Kremlin standards, his dismissal indicated the existence of a Soviet option of rapprochement with Germany. Molotov's appointment was a signal to Germany the USSR would negotiate. The dismissal also signaled to France and Britain the existence of a potential negotiation option with Germany. One British official wrote Litvinov's disappearance meant the loss of an admirable technician or shock-absorber, while Molotov's modus operandi was "more truly Bolshevik than diplomatic or cosmopolitan".

With regard to the signing of the Molotov–Ribbentrop Pact with secret protocols dividing Eastern Europe three months later, Hitler told military commanders; "Litvinov's replacement was decisive". A German official told the Soviet Ambassador Hitler was pleased Litvinov's replacement Molotov was not Jewish. Hitler also wrote to Italian Fascist leader Benito Mussolini that Litvinov's dismissal demonstrated the Kremlin's readiness to alter relations with Berlin, which led to "the most extensive nonaggression pact in existence". When Litvinov was asked about the reasons for his dismissal, he replied; "Do you really think that I was the right person to sign a treaty with Hitler?"

American historian Jeffrey Herf views Litvinov's dismissal and the Molotov–Ribbentrop Pact as conclusive proof the Nazi belief in a Jewish conspiracy that supposedly controlled the governments of the Soviet Union and other allied powers was completely false.

Wartime career

Following the Nazi Soviet Pact, although given little official Soviet recognition, Stalin continued to respect Litvinov. The British Embassy records confirm Litvinov was conspicuous at the 1939 anniversary of the Revolution by Lenin's Mausoleum. He was standing on the edge of a group that included Stalin, Molotov, Kaganovich, Mikoyan, Andreev, Beria, and Dimitrov. Litvinov was in full view of the diplomatic stand of foreign journalists, some of whom had no hesitation in exchanging salutations with Litvinov. The New York Times said about thirty members of the German Trade delegation, the German Military Attaché, and members of a Finnish delegation watched the parade. The emergence of Litvinov wearing his usual flat cap was apparently a source of interest to the German delegation near the tomb; it was Litvinov’s first public appearance for several months in the company as Stalin’s entourage. Litvinov was also in a conspicuous place at the 1940 celebration of the Russian Revolution. According to Holroyd-Doveton, no meaningful position was allotted by Stalin to Litvinov.

In the 21-month period between the declaration of war by France and Britain, and the invasion of the Soviet Union by Germany, Ivy Litvinov describes this period of her life. She said the family spent their time with their daughter-in-law in their dacha  from Moscow  and outside school holidays  in the family apartment in Moscow, when they spent long weekends in the country. For two years, the family played bridge, read music, and went on long walks in the countryside with their two dogs.

On 21 February 1941, Litvinov was dismissed from the Central Committee of the Communist Party on the pretext of his inability to discharge his obligations as a member of the Committee. According to Pope, he was dismissed because Stalin wanted to give no offence to the Germans. Litvinov said: "My more than 40 years in the Party oblige me to say what I think about what has happened. I do not understand why I am being dealt with in such a peremptory style."

Stalin rejected everything Litvinov had said. When Stalin stopped speaking, Litvinov asked: "Does that mean you consider me an enemy of the people?" Stalin answered: "We do not consider you an enemy of the people, but an honest revolutionary".

Litvinov had followed with anxiety the steady advance of Hitler’s armies across Europe and wondered how long Britain could hold out unsupported. Even to Litvinov, the German invasion of the Soviet Union was a surprise; he did not believe Hitler would risk embarking on a second front at this stage of the war  Litvinov told the Governor of Burma when he was en route to the US to take up his appointment as ambassador, Litvinov had not expected Germany to attack the Soviet Union until Germany had dealt with Britain.

German invasion of USSR

The Soviet leaders, as well as Litvinov, were concerned Britain might come to an agreement with Germany. Litvinov was worried Herman Hess’s flight meant Britain was about to make peace with Germany. Litvinov stated all believed the British fleet was steaming up the North Sea for a joint attack with Germany on Leningrad and Kronstadt.  The same day the German invasion of the USSR began, Churchill announced Britain’s intention to give full aid to the Soviet Union. When Litvinov heard of Churchill’s broadcast, he was much relieved.  This is confirmed in the conversation Litvinov had with the Governor of Burma.  Nevertheless, Litvinov was suspicious of the British aristocracy 

On 9 July 1941 Litvinov broadcast in English with Stalin’s approval; he condemned Germany’s attack on the Soviet Union. 
No agreement or treaty, no document signed by Hitler and his henchmen, no promise or assurance on their part, no declaration of neutrality, and no relations with them whatsoever can provide a guarantee against sudden and unprovoked attack. Hitler and his gang considered themselves above all conceptions of peaceful coexistence and international obligations. There is nothing that distinguishes their society from the jungle. Hitler has always ruled by the principle of dividing and attacking. He uses the most insidious methods to prevent the intended victims from organising a common resistance, taking special pains to prevent war on two fronts against the most powerful European countries. His strategy is to mark down the victims and strike them one by one in an order prompted by circumstances. Hitler intended first to deal with the Western States so as to be free to fall upon the Soviet Union. 

Hitler had not the training of a Channel swimmer yet, so another plan matured in his brain. Believing that he had secured himself by a pact of truce in the West, he decided upon a Blitzkrieg, a lightning war in the East in order immediately after this war to fall with added strength upon Britain and finish her off. He worked at the same time to prevent simultaneous action against himself from the West and East by driving between them an ideological wedge.

Litvinov then praised Churchill by describing his statement on the day of the attack as one delivered with "statesman-like promptness that is characteristic of him". Churchill informed the world Hitler's actions were not a surprise to him, and that a victory over the USSR by Hitler would be a catastrophe for the British Empire.  

Churchill had previously ordered Cadogan to inform Maisky British intelligence concerning the threatening German troop movements. Litvinov concluded: "The people of the Soviet Union have responded with enthusiasm to the appeal of the Soviet Government and our beloved leader Stalin".

Ambassador to the United States and later 

Following his dismissal as head of Narkomindel, Litvinov was dispatched to Washington, D.C., to serve as the Soviet Union's Ambassador to the United States. Like Winston Churchill, Litvinov had doubts about the Munich Agreement. Following the Nazi invasion of the Soviet Union on 22 June 1941, Litvinov said in a radio broadcast to Britain and the United States: "We always realized the danger which a Hitler victory in the West could constitute for us". After the United States entered the war, he encouraged President Franklin D. Roosevelt to focus on the Mediterranean and Middle East theatre  to prevent Axis forces in North Africa from advancing towards the Caucasus.

Early in November 1941, Litvinov was summoned to see Stalin and told his services were required as ambassador to the United States. In the US, the appointment was met with enthusiasm. The New York Times stated: "Stalin has decided to place his ablest and most forceful diplomat and one who enjoys greater prestige in this country. He is known as a man of exceptional ability, adroit as well as forceful. It is believed that Stalin, in designating him for the ambassadorship, felt Litvinov could exercise real influence in Washington."

President Roosevelt stated Litvinov’s appointment was "most fortunate that the Soviet Government have deemed it advisable to send as ambassador a statesman who has already held high office in his own country". When Litvinov arrived in the US, growing Soviet resistance to the German army, which was racing to take Moscow before the onset of the Russian winter, was winning the Soviet Union supporters. According to The Washington Post:Both Mrs Cordell Hull, the Secretary of State’s wife, and the Vice-President’s wife, Mrs Wallace, had travelled to the Soviet Embassy for celebrations to mark the 24th anniversary of the Soviet Revolution in 1941, where they were greeted by Mr and Mrs Gromyko and Mrs Umansky. The Under Secretary of State, Sumner Welles, Jessie Jones, the Commercial Secretary, and Francis Biddle, the Attorney General, were also present. Most foreign countries except Spain and Finland were represented. 

Litvinov immediately gained popularity. In early December 1941, the Soviet Union’s war-relief organisation called a large meeting in Madison Square, New York City, where the auditorium was filled to capacity. Litvinov, speaking in English, told of the suffering in the Soviet Union. A woman in the front row ran up to the stage and donated her diamond necklace; whilst another gave a cheque for $15,000. At the end, Litvinov said; "What we need is a second front". 

The highlight of Litvinov’s eighteen months ambassadorship was the 25th celebration of the Russian Revolution on the 7 November 1942.  1,200 guests, representing all of the United Nations, entered the reception hall to shake hands with Litvinov. Only the US President and his staff at work on the African campaign were missing. The Russians were happy they had more serious affairs with which to attend. Vice-President Wallace, Secretary of the Treasury Morgenthau, Under Secretary of State Sumner Welles and Mrs Woodrow Wilson, Edward Stettinius—the Lend-Lease administrator—and Tom Connolly, chairman of the Senate Foreign Relations Committee, were among the guests. Russian vodka and a sturgeon from the Volga were supplied to the guests. 

The following day, Litvinov and his wife travelled to New York to attend celebrations. The New York Times on 8 November said Madison Square was overflowing with a wildly cheering crowd of 20,000 for the annual tribute to the Soviet Union in Litvinov's presence. The event was attended by the Soviet Union’s old friends and the US Vice-President General McNair, commanding general of Army Ground Forces, capitalist Thomas Lamont, and Catholic professor Francis McMahon, who said: "speaking up for Russia would be disloyal to his religion and country".

Roosevelt became annoyed with Litvinov’s second-front zeal; he told Harriman: "The US might ask for Litvinov’s recall". Harriman told Litvinov Roosevelt was upset but did not repeat what the President had said. Harriman said: "If Litvinov continued that way, he would get into serious difficulties with the President. Litvinov, who had been ebullient, collapsed so completely."  Litvinov’s ambassadorship was now experiencing difficulties. Litvinov said the Soviet Government had forbidden him from appearing in public or making any public speeches.

After returning to Soviet Union, Litvinov became deputy minister for foreign affairs. He was dismissed from his post after an interview given to Richard C. Hottelet on 18 June 1946 in which he said a war between the West and the Soviet Union was inevitable.

Death and legacy 

Maxim Litvinov died on on 31 December 1951. After his death, rumours he was murdered on Stalin's instructions to the Ministry of Internal Affairs circulated. According to Anastas Mikoyan, a lorry deliberately collided with Litvinov's car as it rounded a bend near the Litvinov dacha on 31 December 1951, and he later died of his injuries. British television journalist Tim Tzouliadis stated; "The assassination of Litvinov marked an intensification of Stalin's anti-Semitic campaign". According to Litvinov's wife and daughter, however, Stalin was still on good terms with Litvinov at the time of his death. They said he had serious heart problems and was given the best treatment available during the final weeks of his life, and that he died from a heart attack on 31 December 1951.

After Litvinov's death, his widow Ivy remained in the Soviet Union until she returned to live in Britain in 1972.

In his reminiscences dictated to a supporter later in life, Vyacheslav Molotov—Litvinov's replacement as chief of foreign affairs and right-hand man of Joseph Stalin—said Litvinov was "intelligent" and "first rate" but said Stalin and he "didn't trust him" and consequently "left him out of negotiations" with the United States during the war. Molotov called Litvinov "not a bad diplomat—a good one" but also called him "quite an opportunist" who "greatly sympathized with [Leon] Trotsky, [Grigory] Zinoviev, and [Lev] Kamenev". According to Molotov; "Litvinov remained among the living [in the Great Purge] only by chance".

Litvinov's grandson Pavel Litvinov, a physicist, writer and Soviet-era dissident, resides in the United States.

See also 
 Foreign relations of the Soviet Union
 Soviet–German relations before 1941

Footnotes

Sources

Further reading 
 Gorodetsky,  Gabriel. Soviet Foreign Policy, 1917–1991: a Retrospective. London: Routledge, 1994.
 Levin, Nora.  The Jews in the Soviet Union Since 1917: Paradox of Survival. In Two Volumes. New York: New York University Press, 1988.
 Lockhart, R.H. Bruce. Memoirs of a British Agent: Being an Account of the Author's Early Life in Many Lands and of his Official Mission to Moscow in 1918. New York: G.P. Putnam's Sons, 1933.
 Nekrich, Aleksandr Moiseevich. Pariahs, partners, predators: German-Soviet relations, 1922-1941 (Columbia University Press, 1997).
 Osborne, Patrick R.  Operation Pike: Britain Versus the Soviet Union, 1939–1941. Westport, CT: Greenwood Publishing Group, 2000.
 Phillips, Hugh D. Between the revolution and the West: a political biography of Maxim M. Litvinov (Westview Press, 1992).
 Roberts, Geoffrey. "Litvinov's Lost Peace, 1941–1946." Journal of Cold War Studies 4.2 (2002): 23-54.
 Roberts, Geoffrey.  "The Fall of Litvinov: A Revisionist View," Journal of Contemporary History, vol. 27, no. 4 (1992), pp. 639–657.
 Saul, Norman E. Friends Or Foes?: The United States and Soviet Russia, 1921-1941 (University Press of Kansas, 2006).
 Ulam, Ulam. Stalin: The Man and His Era. Boston: Beacon Press, 1989.

Works 
 The Bolshevik Revolution: Its Rise and Meaning. London: British Socialist Party, n.d. (1919).

External links 

  Biography six versions from various resources
  Maxim Litvinov, Soviet biography.
 

1876 births
1951 deaths
People from Białystok
People from Belostoksky Uyezd
Jews from the Russian Empire
Jewish Soviet politicians
Soviet people of Polish-Jewish descent
Russian Social Democratic Labour Party members
Old Bolsheviks
Central Committee of the Communist Party of the Soviet Union members
Soviet Ministers of Foreign Affairs
Ambassador Extraordinary and Plenipotentiary (Soviet Union)
First convocation members of the Soviet of the Union
Second convocation members of the Soviet of Nationalities
League of Nations people
Ambassadors of the Soviet Union to the United States
Ambassadors of the Soviet Union to Cuba
Articles containing video clips
Recipients of the Order of Lenin